Asteroporpa is a genus of echinoderms belonging to the family Gorgonocephalidae.

The species of this genus are found in Central Atlantic Ocean and Pacific Ocean.

Species:

Asteroporpa annulata 
Asteroporpa australiensis 
Asteroporpa bellator 
Asteroporpa hadracantha 
Asteroporpa indicus 
Asteroporpa koyoae 
Asteroporpa lindneri 
Asteroporpa muricatopatella 
Asteroporpa paucidens 
Asteroporpa pulchra 
Asteroporpa reticulata

References

Gorgonocephalidae
Ophiuroidea genera